The Cotton Tree is a Ceiba pentandra, also known commonly as a kapok tree, a historic symbol of Freetown, the capital city of Sierra Leone. The Cotton Tree gained importance in 1792 when a group of formerly enslaved African Americans, who had gained their freedom by fighting for the British during the American War of Independence, settled the site of modern Freetown. These former Black Loyalist soldiers, also known as Black Nova Scotians (because they came from Nova Scotia after leaving the United States), resettled in Sierra Leone and founded Freetown on March 11, 1792. The descendants of the Nova Scotian settlers form part of the Sierra Leone Creole ethnicity today.

History
People first landed on the shoreline and walked up to a giant tree just above the bay, where they held a thanksgiving service, gathering around the tree in a large group and praying and singing hymns to thank God for their deliverance to a free land.  The tree's exact age is unknown, but it is known to have existed in 1787.

It is the oldest cotton tree in Freetown, Sierra Leone. It stands near the Supreme Court building, the music club building, and the National Museum. The tree has a lot of unique history. It was under this tree that the Nova Scotian settlers first prayed upon landing on the soil of Liberty and freedom, to start their new lives as free people. They regarded it as the symbol of their present situations during that period. Before these newly freed Africans arrived, Sierra Leone had already been inhabited. These newly arrived Africans gave the capital the name it bears today, Freetown. Sierra Leoneans still pray and make offerings to their ancestors for peace and prosperity beneath the Cotton Tree.

See also 

 List of individual trees
 Cotton Tree, Queensland, Australia

References

External links 
 "Cotton Tree – Freetown, Sierra Leone", Atlas Obscura.

Flora of Sierra Leone
Geography of Freetown
History of Sierra Leone
Individual trees in Sierra Leone
People of Black Nova Scotian descent
Sierra Leone Creole people